Alexandre Ferré also known as Firmin or Saint-Firmin, (? – 27 February 1839) in Paris was a 19th-century French playwright.

A former sergeant in the National Guard, he became actor and tenor at Versailles. Hired by the Théâtre de la Gaîté then, after a tour in Seine-et-Oise, at the Théâtre de l'Ambigu-Comique, he played the part of Don César de Bazan in Ruy Blas at the inauguration of the Théâtre de la Renaissance 8 November 1838. Sick, he last played 5 January 1839 and died a month later after this success. He was then replaced in that role by Charles de Chilly.

His plays were presented among others at the Théâtre de la Gaîté, the Théâtre de l'Ambigu-Comique and the Théâtre du Panthéon.

Works 
1833: Cinq-Mars, drama in 5 acts in prose
1836: Le Ménage de Titi, tableau in 1 act, mingled with couplets, with Théodore de Lustières
1837: Baron le comédien, anecdote-vaudeville in 1 act, with Jean-Baptiste Tuffet
1838: Maître Job, ou Ma femme et mon télescope, vaudeville in 1 act
1839: Tiennette, ou le Racoleur et la jeune fille, vaudeville in 1 act, with Adolphe Guénée
1846: Je vous y prends ! ou l'Assurance mutuelle, vaudeville épisodique in 1 act, posth.

Bibliography 
 Joseph Marie Quérard, Les supercheries littéraires dévoilées, 1852,

Notes 

19th-century French male actors
French male stage actors
19th-century French dramatists and playwrights
Year of birth missing
1839 deaths